The 10th Politburo of the Chinese Communist Party was elected at the 1st Plenary Session of the 10th Central Committee on August 30, 1973, consisting of 21 members and 4 alternate members. There were additions to the membership in 1973 and 1977.  It was informally supervised by the Politburo Standing Committee of the Chinese Communist Party.  It was preceded by the 9th Politburo of the Chinese Communist Party.

Members (21) 
 Mao Zedong, Chairman of the Party Central Committee and member of the Politburo Standing Committee (died in September 1976)
 Zhou Enlai, Vice Chairman of the Party Central Committee and member of the Politburo Standing Committee (died in January 1976)
 Wang Hongwen, Vice Chairman of the Party Central Committee and member of the Politburo Standing Committee (arrested in October 1976; dismissed in July 1977)
 Kang Sheng, Vice Chairman of the Party Central Committee and member of the Politburo Standing Committee (died in December 1975)
 Ye Jianying, Vice Chairman of the Party Central Committee and member of the Politburo Standing Committee
 Li Desheng, Vice Chairman of the Party Central Committee and member of the Politburo Standing Committee until January 1975
 Zhu De, member of the Politburo Standing Committee (died in July 1976)
 Zhang Chunqiao, member of the Politburo Standing Committee (arrested in October 1976; dismissed in July 1977)
 Dong Biwu, member of the Politburo Standing Committee (died in April 1975)

 Others in stroke order of surnames:
Wei Guoqing
Liu Bocheng
Jiang Qing (arrested in October 1976; dismissed in July 1977)
Xu Shiyou
Hua Guofeng, appointed First Vice Chairman of the Party Central Committee in April 1976; Chairman in October 1976
Ji Dengkui
Wu De
Wang Dongxing
Chen Yonggui
Chen Xilian
Li Xiannian
Yao Wenyuan (arrested in October 1976; dismissed in July 1977)

Alternate members (4)
Wu Guixian
Su Zhenhua
Ni Zhifu
Saifuddin Azizi

Member appointed in December 1973 (1)
Deng Xiaoping, elected Vice Chairman of the Party Central Committee and member of the Politburo Standing Committee in January 1975 (dismissed in April 1976)

Member elected in July 1977 (1)
at the 3rd Plenary Session of the 10th Central Committee:
Deng Xiaoping, elected at the same time Vice Chairman of the Party Central Committee and member of the Politburo Standing Committee

References

External links 
  Gazette of the 1st Session of the 10th CCP Central Committee

Politburo of the Chinese Communist Party
1973 in China